Marwa Sultan (born January 31, 1983, in Cairo) is an Egyptian sport shooter. She placed 49th in the women's 10 metre air rifle event at the 2000 Summer Olympics.

References

1983 births
Living people
ISSF rifle shooters
Egyptian female sport shooters
Olympic shooters of Egypt
Shooters at the 2000 Summer Olympics
21st-century Egyptian women